The Conduit Road Schoolhouse is an historic school, located at 4954 MacArthur Boulevard, Northwest, Washington, D.C., in the Palisades neighborhood.

History
It was built as a one-room schoolhouse on Conduit Road. It replaced a school of 1864, which burned down. It closed in 1928, and served as a branch of the public library. In 1965, it was saved for use as the Children's Museum.

See also
 National Register of Historic Places listings in the District of Columbia

References

School buildings completed in 1765
School buildings on the National Register of Historic Places in Washington, D.C.
The Palisades (Washington, D.C.)